Emma Tomelty is an Australian creative director, with a background in dance, choreography and fashion. Tomelty has worked on music videos by Australian artists including Timomatic, Ricki-Lee Coulter, Hermitude and Jessica Mauboy.

Awards and nominations

ARIA Music Awards
The ARIA Music Awards is an annual awards ceremony that recognises excellence, innovation, and achievement across all genres of Australian music. They commenced in 1987. 

! 
|-
| 2012
| Emma Tomelty for Hermitude's "Speak of the Devil"
|rowspan="2" | Best Video
| 
|rowspan="2" |  
|-
| 2017
| Emma Tomelty for Jessica Mauboy'	"Fallin'"
| 
|-

J Awards
The J Awards are an annual series of Australian music awards that were established by the Australian Broadcasting Corporation's youth-focused radio station Triple J. They commenced in 2005.

|-
| J Awards of 2011
| Emma Tomelty for Hermitude' "Speak of the Devil"
| Australian Video of the Year
| 
|-

References

Australian film directors
Year of birth missing (living people)
Living people
Australian documentary filmmakers
Australian music video directors